Milestone Mountain is a thirteener on the Great Western Divide, a subrange of the Sierra Nevada. The summit marks a point on the boundary between Sequoia and Kings Canyon national parks. It takes its name from the shape of the obelisk on its peak, and has been called this since at least 1873.

References

External links 
 

Mountains of Kings Canyon National Park
Mountains of Sequoia National Park
Mountains of Tulare County, California
Mountains of Northern California